Georgina Allison Conder is a New Zealand film producer. She is most noted as a producer of the 2021 film Night Raiders, which was a Canadian Screen Award nominee for Best Picture at the 10th Canadian Screen Awards in 2022.

Her other credits as a producer have included the films Free in Deed, The Breaker Upperers, Reunion and Cousins.

References

External links

New Zealand film producers
New Zealand women film producers
Living people
Year of birth missing (living people)